The Great Little Trading Company (GLTC) is an online children's retailer that specializes in children's furniture, room accessories, and toys.

History
GLTC was founded in 1997 by two American women living in London. Jamie Reeve is the current CEO.

GLTC helps parents to create and organize homes for their families and is an online company that delivers to locations all over the world.

Products
Their range of children's toys is designed for children aged 2–10 years old.

Awards
GLTC have won a number of awards for their children's furniture, toys, gifts and  customer service.

The Great Little Trading Co has won the Best Children's Retailer at the ECMOD awards for the past three years in 2012, 2013 and 2014.
Below is a list of some of the awards they have won:

2015  Best Pre-School Toy Category (Silver: Cavendish Kitchen), Prima Baby Awards
2014  Best Online Retailer Baby & Me Magazine
2014  Best Wooden Toy 3-6yrs (Gold: Tea Trolley), Loved By Parents Awards
2013  Best Toy Design (Gold: Carnival Playhouse), Loved By Parents Awards
2013  Best Online Gift Retailer (Shortlisted) Junior Magazine Awards
2012  Best Children's Bedrooms (Online Shopping Award, Mother & Child Category), Sheerluxe.com
2012  Best Children's Retailer (Commendation), Junior Magazine

References

Furniture retailers of the United Kingdom
Retail companies established in 1997
Toy companies of the United Kingdom